(German, literally 'liver-cheese'; sometimes also Leberkäs or Leberka(a)s) in Austria and the Swabian, Bavarian and Franconian parts of Germany, 'leverkaas' in the Netherlands and Fleischkäse ("meat-cheese") in Saarland, Baden, Switzerland and Tyrol) is a specialty food found in the south of Germany, in Austria and parts of Switzerland, similar to bologna sausage. It consists of beef, pork and bacon and is made by grinding the ingredients very finely and then baking it as a loaf in a bread pan until it has a crunchy brown crust. Variations may be made using other kinds of meat such as horse meat or turkey, or may contain additional ingredients such as cheese or minced chili peppers.

Leberkäse is also called Fleischlaib, which literally means "meat-loaf" in German, but it is not a meatloaf, which in German is called Hackbraten (literally "ground roast", from Hackfleisch, "ground meat", and ein Braten, "a roast"), faschierter Braten (literally "minced roast", from faschieren, "to mince", and ein Braten, "a roast"), Wiegebraten, falscher Hase ("false hare" or "faux hare") and Heuchelhase ("mock-hare").

History 

Fleischkäse is said to have been invented in 1776, although this story has been heavily contested. The name "Leberkäse" literally translates to "liver-cheese" but developed by folk etymology from an archaic form of the word Laib ("loaf") and Käse ("cheese") (cf. English "head cheese"), although it traditionally contains neither liver nor cheese. According to the origin of the word, Leberkäse means "left-overs in a box", which also aptly describes the production of the product. Its modern name is misleading, as Leberkäse originally had no reference to the organ liver, as is still the case today in the Bavarian Leberkas. "Leber" is originally derived from Old High German leiba, meaning "left-over". The suffix -kas is a dialect variant for "Kasten", i.e. "box".

According to German food laws, only products called "Bavarian Leberkäse" are allowed not to contain liver; otherwise, there must be a minimum liver content of 4%. Some local variants must contain even more liver; for example, the liver content of "Stuttgarter Leberkäse" must be at least 5%. The type without liver is normally called Fleischkäse (literally "meat-cheese") if it is not made in Bavaria.

Preparation 
Leberkäse is widespread in Germany, Switzerland, the Netherlands, and Austria, and ingredients may vary from region to region. The most common meat is lean pork or pork belly, ground fine with herbs and spices that may include coriander, mace, ginger, salt, and pepper. A curing salt is also used, typically Prague Powder #1, which helps the dish retain its pinkish hue. The meat batter is baked in a loaf pan until the top develops a brown crust.

Consumption 

Leberkäse  is traditionally enjoyed in a variety of ways, including:
Most of the time, it is served hot on a Semmel (hard wheat flour bread-roll) and traditionally seasoned with mustard or pickles. The result, generally called Leberkäsesemmel (in Swabia and the Franconian parts of Bavaria, Leberkäsweckle, Leberkäsweggla or LKW in short), is a staple of South-German and Austrian fast food stalls, butcher shops and supermarkets. 
Cut into approximately finger-thick slices, usually served with traditionally medium hot mustard or Bavarian sweet mustard or sometimes ketchup and accompanied by soft pretzels, Sauerkraut or Kartoffelsalat (potato salad).
Pan-fried (abgebräunt or gebraten, "browned"), in which case it is commonly accompanied by a fried egg and German potato salad, or Bratkartoffeln (home fries) and sometimes spinach. This is a very common Biergarten dish.
Cold, cut into very thin slices and used on a variety of sandwiches, usually seasoned with pickled cucumbers. 
Two slices of Leberkäse with a slice of ham and cheese in the middle are dipped into eggs and coated with breadcrumbs and then fried in the pan. This variant is called falsches Cordon Bleu ("mock Cordon Bleu").

Variants 

Known variants include:

 Käseleberkäse, which adds small pieces of evenly distributed cheese to the mix.
 Paprika-Leberkäse (German Paprika = bell pepper), which adds small pieces of pickles and bell peppers.
 Pizzaleberkäse, which adds cheese, cut bell peppers, pickles and small cubes of salami, named for its similarity to pizza.
 Pferdeleberkäse (German Pferd = horse), which is indeed made of horse-meat (German Pferdefleisch), otherwise not widely consumed in the German language area. Popular in Vienna, Austria.
 Zwiebelleberkäse (German Zwiebel = onion), which is made with onions. Common in the Swabian and Franconian regions of Germany.
 Pikanter Leberkäse, which adds spices and is very popular in Austria.

In addition, many butchers have invented their own unique varieties.

See also 

Bavarian cuisine
German words and phrases